Whiteville is a town in Hardeman County, Tennessee, United States. The population was 2,606 at the 2020 census and 4,638 at the 2010 census,  Whiteville is the location of two privately owned prisons, Whiteville Correctional Facility and Hardeman County Correctional Center.

Geography
Whiteville is located in northwestern Hardeman County at  (35.324496, −89.145721). U.S. Route 64 runs through the southern part of the town, leading southeast  to Bolivar, the county seat, and southwest  to Somerville. Tennessee State Route 100 runs east from Whiteville  to Henderson. State Route 179 runs north from the center of Whiteville  to Interstate 40 at Willis.

The town is drained by the headwaters of Hickory Creek, which flows north to the Hatchie River.

Demographics

2020 census

The initial results of the 2020 United States census listed 2,606 people, 289 households, and 203 families residing in the town. The town appealed these numbers, which did not include the population of the town's two prisons. In 2023, the Census Bureau released updated numbers, increasing the population count to 4,564.

Notes
 U.S. Census web page not updated as of February 18, 2023.

2000 census
As of the census of 2000, there were 3,148 people, 457 households, and 308 families residing in the town. The population density was 1,317.7 people per square mile (508.6/km2). There were 510 housing units at an average density of 213.5 per square mile (82.4/km2). The racial makeup of the town was 38.02% White, 60.93% African American, 0.10% Native American, 0.06% Asian, 0.13% from other races, and 0.76% from two or more races. Hispanic or Latino of any race were 0.76% of the population.

There were 457 households, out of which 29.5% had children under the age of 18 living with them, 37.4% were married couples living together, 26.5% had a female householder with no husband present, and 32.4% were non-families. Of all households 29.3% were made up of individuals, and 16.0% had someone living alone who was 65 years of age or older. The average household size was 2.53 and the average family size was 3.12.

In the town, the population was spread out, with 10.5% under the age of 18, 16.9% from 18 to 24, 51.4% from 25 to 44, 14.3% from 45 to 64, and 6.9% who were 65 years of age or older. The median age was 32 years. For every 100 females there were 387.3 males. For every 100 females age 18 and over, there were 483.4 males.

The median income for a household in the town was $22,368, and the median income for a family was $28,603. Males had a median income of $22,050 versus $19,013 for females. The per capita income for the town was $11,310. About 21.0% of families and 18.7% of the population were below the poverty line, including 18.4% of those under age 18 and 20.6% of those age 65 or over.

Education
The Tennessee Colleges of Applied Technology have a location in Whiteville.

Notable people
 Calvin Newborn, jazz guitarist
 Phineas Newborn Jr., jazz pianist

See also

 List of towns in Tennessee

References

External links

 

Towns in Hardeman County, Tennessee
Majority-minority cities and towns in Tennessee